Castletroy (meaning O'Troy's Landing or O'Troy's Callow) is a suburb of Limerick, Ireland. The town was named after Castle Troy also known as The Black Castle, which is located on the southern bank of the River Shannon, roughly 2km East of the University of Limerick. However the name likely predates the castle itself as the area may have been used by the O’Turrain clan (who were no longer in the area by the time the castle was built) having used it as a safe harbour for navigating the river.

History
Historically, the district was entirely separate to Limerick, and consisted of little development aside from the villages of Annacotty and Monaleen.  With the creation of the University of Limerick, as well as the growth of Limerick city itself, this began to change. Castletroy is one of the fastest-growing residential areas in Ireland and has now engulfed the old villages of Annacotty and Monaleen (Móin a lín - field of flax).

Castletroy includes three primary schools Milford NS, Monaleen NS and a Gaelscoil (Gaelscoil Chaladh an Treoigh), the secondary school, Castletroy College, and a number of hotels including the Kilmurry Lodge Hotel and Castletroy Park Hotel. It is also host to both Milford and Monaleen GAA Clubs.

Castletroy Golf Course is well known and divides Monaleen and Castletroy itself. Kilbane, Castletroy Heights, Monaleen Heights and Monaleen Park were the original housing developments and were once surrounded by farmland. These houses are the oldest.

Recent developments include numerous sprawling housing estates, with much of the new development concentrated near Castletroy College. It includes a SuperValu supermarket and 24 mall shops, McDonald's restaurant and an eight-screen Odeon cinema. Lidl have recently opened a branch in Castletroy. A local park has also been built including a children's playground and skatepark. The National Technology Park is home to some major business in Castletroy such as 'Vistakon', a contact lens division of Johnson & Johnson and Viagogo an online ticket marketplace for buying and selling tickets to live events. More recently Chicago based financial institution Northern Trust has expended in Castletroy's Hamilton House 2 and opened a new office in City East Plaza also in Castletroy.

In the past several attempts were made by Limerick City Council to expand its area of control to include Castletroy as part of its plan to expand the old city boundary to include large suburbs just outside the boundary. Up until June 2014 Castletroy and neighbouring suburbs were not within the city boundary despite being part of the city’s overall urban fabric.  The amalgamation of the 2 local authorities in Limerick from 2014 saw all areas of Limerick (city and county) come under one united and single authority for the first time. The merger of the authorities saw the city area expanded to include all urban areas (including Castletroy) within the Limerick urban area into the Limerick Metropolitan District within the merged Limerick authority.

Places of interest

Castle Troy also known as The Black Castle 
Located on the southern bank of the River Shannon, roughly 2km East of the University of Limerick. Castle Troy was erected in the reign of Henry III (1216-1272) by one  of the O' Briens. Many years later it was the seat of the Mac Keoghs, a war like tribe, often in conflict with neighbouring chiefs. The MacKeoghs continued to hold land in Castletroy, but at some point before the reign of Elizabeth I the castle was taken over by their overlord, the Earl of Desmond. The Earl of Desmond rebelled against the English monarchy and their lands were foirfeit and the Castle Troy became the property of Sir John Bourke of Brittas.

According to tradition when Cromwell landed in 1649 with his New Model Army his general Henry Ireton in 1651 led an army on Limerick and set up cannons on Harty's Hill and battered the castle as it was ideally positioned to defend the city against forces moving down the River Shannon. Castle Troy was granted to James Duke of York in 1666 and later sold to the Hollow Blade Company in 1703.

Castletroy Castle's history is recounted in verse in Hogan's "Lays, Legends of Thomond":

 Lo! grey Castletroy by war,
 Tide and time batter'd Stands,
 like an old chief With his armour all shatter'd
 As if musing, in gloomy and gaunt desolation
 On the red feudal days
 When Green Erin was a Nation.
 There the warlike Mac keoghs,
 In their power and revell'd
 And often in fight
 Were their sounding spears levell'd
 'Till Cromwell, the fiend, with his
 Tower-cleaving cannon,
 Ploughed their strong castle walls
 On the brink of the Shannon".

Jewish Graveyard 
Also in Castletroy is a small and little-known Jewish graveyard. It dates from the late 19th century when Limerick had a sizable Jewish community and was renovated and reopened by Chief Rabbi Mervis in 1990. Limerick's Jewish population waned over the decades, though a sizable portion of Jews lived in Castletroy as late as the 1980s.

References

Jewish Irish history
Limerick (city)